Craig Williams may refer to:

 Human Tornado (born 1983), real name Craig Williams, professional wrestler
 Craig Williams (cricketer) (born 1984), Namibian cricketer
 Craig Williams (Australian footballer) (born 1954), Australian rules footballer
 Craig Williams (jockey) (born 1977), Australian jockey
 Craig Williams (British politician) (born 1974), British politician
Craig Williams (Iowa politician), member of the Iowa Senate
 Craig E. Williams, Vietnam War veteran and co-founder of the Vietnam Veterans of America Foundation
 Craig Williams Jr. (born 1989), American basketball player
Wendell Craig Williams (born 1965), often known as Craig Williams, former Marine and member of the Pennsylvania House of Representatives.